Grimms' Fairy Tales, originally known as the Children's and Household Tales, is a German collection of fairy tales by the Grimm brothers or "Brothers Grimm", Jacob and Wilhelm, first published on 20 December 1812. Vol. 1 of the first edition contained 86 stories, which were followed by 70 more tales, numbered consecutively, in the 1st edition, Vol. 2, in 1815. By the seventh edition in 1857, the corpus of tales had expanded to 200 tales and 10 "Children's Legends". It is listed by UNESCO in its Memory of the World Registry.

Origin 
Jacob and Wilhelm Grimm were two of 10 children from Dorothea (née Zimmer) and Philipp Wilhelm Grimm. Jacob and Wilhelm were sent to school for a classical education once they were of age, while their father was working. They were very hard-working pupils throughout their education. They followed in their father's footsteps and started to pursue a degree in law, and German history. However, in 1796, their father died at the age of 44 from pneumonia. This was a tragic time for the Grimms because the family lost all financial support and relied on their aunt, Henriette Zimmer, and grandfather, Johann Hermann Zimmer. At the age of 11, Jacob was compelled to be head of the household and provide for his family. After downsizing their home because of financial reasons, Henriette sent Jacob and Wilhelm to study at the prestigious high school, Lyzeum, in Kassel. In school, their grandfather wrote to them saying that because of their current situation, they needed to apply themselves industriously to secure their future welfare.

Shortly after attending Lyzeum, their grandfather died and they were again left to themselves to support their family in the future. The two became intent on becoming the best students at Lyzeum, since they wanted to live up to their deceased father. They studied more than twelve hours a day and established similar work habits. They also shared the same bed and room at school. After four years of rigorous schooling, Jacob graduated head of his class in 1802. Wilhelm contracted asthma and scarlet fever, which delayed his graduation by one year although he was also head of his class. Both were given special dispensations for studying law at the University of Marburg. They particularly needed this dispensation because their social standing at the time was not high enough to have normal admittance. University of Marburg was a small, 200-person university where most students were more interested in activities other than schooling. Most of the students received stipends even though they were the richest in the state. The Grimms did not receive any stipends because of their social standing; however, they were not upset by it since it kept the distractions away.

Professor Friedrich Carl von Savigny 
Jacob attended the university first and showed proof of his hard work ethic and quick intelligence. Wilhelm joined Jacob at the university, and Jacob drew the attention of Professor Friedrich Carl von Savigny, founder of its historical school of law. He became a prominent personal and professional influence on the brothers. Throughout their time at university, the brothers became quite close with Savigny and were able to use his personal library as they became interested in German law, history, and folklore. Savigny asked Jacob to join him in Paris as an assistant, and Jacob went with him for a year. While he was gone, Wilhelm became very interested in German literature and started collecting books. Once Jacob returned to Kassel in 1806, he adopted his brother's passion and changed his focus from law to German literature. While Jacob studied literature and took care of their siblings, Wilhelm continued on to receive his degree in law at Marburg. During the Napoleonic Wars, Jacob interrupted his studies to serve the Hessian War Commission.

In 1808, their mother died, and this was especially hard on Jacob as he took the position of father figure, while also trying to be a brother. From 1806 to 1810, the Grimm family had barely enough money to properly feed and clothe themselves. During this time, Jacob and Wilhelm were concerned about the stability of the family.

Achim von Arnim and Clemens Brentano were good friends of the brothers and wanted to publish folk tales, so they asked the brothers to collect oral tales for publication. The Grimms collected many old books and asked friends and acquaintances in Kassel to tell tales and to gather stories from others. Jacob and Wilhelm sought to collect these stories in order to write a history of old German Poesie and to preserve history.

Composition

The first volume of the first edition was published in 1812, containing 86 stories; the second volume of 70 stories followed in 1815. For the second edition, two volumes containing the KHM texts were issued in 1819 and the appendix was removed and published separately in the third volume in 1822, totaling 170 tales. The third edition appeared in 1837, the fourth edition in 1840, the fifth edition in 1843, the sixth edition in 1850, and the seventh edition in 1857. Stories were added, and also removed, from one edition to the next, until the seventh held 210 tales. Some later editions were extensively illustrated, first by Philipp Grot Johann and, after his death in 1892, by German illustrator Robert Leinweber.

The first volumes were much criticized because, although they were called "Children's Tales", they were not regarded as suitable for children, both for the scholarly information included and the subject matter. Many changes through the editions – such as turning the wicked mother of the first edition in Snow White and Hansel and Gretel (shown in original Grimm stories as Hänsel and Grethel) to a stepmother, were probably made with an eye to such suitability. Jack Zipes believes that the Grimms made the change in later editions because they "held motherhood sacred".

They removed sexual references—such as Rapunzel's innocently asking why her dress was getting tight around her belly, and thus naively revealing to the witch Dame Gothel her pregnancy and the prince's visits—but, in many respects, violence, particularly when punishing villains, become more prevalent.

Popularity 
The brothers' initial intention of their first book, Children’s and Household Tales, was to establish a name for themselves in the world. After publishing the first KHM in 1812, they published a second, augmented and re-edited, volume in 1815. In 1816 Volume I of the German Legends was published, followed in 1818, Volume II. However, the book that established their international success was not any of their tales, but Jacob's German Grammar in 1819. In 1825, the Brothers published their Kleine Ausgabe or "small edition", a selection of 50 tales designed for child readers. This children's version went through ten editions between 1825 and 1858.

In 1830, Jacob became a professor at University of Göttingen and in 1835, Wilhelm also became a professor. During these years Jacob wrote a third volume of German Grammar and Wilhelm prepared the third revision of the Children’s and Household Tales.

In 1837, King Ernst August II revoked the constitution of 1833 and was attempting to restore absolutism in the Kingdom of Hanover. Since Göttingen was a part of Hanover, the brothers were expected to take an oath of allegiance. However, the brothers and five other professors led a protest against this and were heavily supported by the student body since all of these professors were well renowned. Jacob left Göttingen immediately and Wilhelm followed him to Kassel a few months later.

In Kassel, the Grimms devoted themselves to researching and studying. A close friend of theirs, Bettina von Arnim, was also a talented writer. Savigny and others convinced the King of Prussia, Friedrich Wilhelm IV, to allow the brothers to teach and conduct research at the University of Berlin. In March 1841, the brothers did just this and also continued to work on the German Dictionary.

Influence
Kinder- und Hausmärchen (Children and Household Tales) is listed by UNESCO in its Memory of the World Registry.

The Grimms believed that the most natural and pure forms of culture were linguistic and based in history. The work of the Brothers Grimm influenced other collectors, both inspiring them to collect tales and leading them to similarly believe, in a spirit of romantic nationalism, that the fairy tales of a country were particularly representative of it, to the neglect of cross-cultural influence. Among those influenced were the Russian Alexander Afanasyev, the Norwegians Peter Christen Asbjørnsen and Jørgen Moe, the English Joseph Jacobs, and Jeremiah Curtin, an American who collected Irish tales.  There was not always a pleased reaction to their collection. Joseph Jacobs was in part inspired by his complaint that English children did not read English fairy tales; in his own words, "What Perrault began, the Grimms completed".

W. H. Auden praised the collection during World War II as one of the founding works of Western culture. The tales themselves have been put to many uses. Adolf Hitler praised them so strongly that the Allies of World War II warned against them, as Hitler thought they were folkish tales showing children with sound racial instincts seeking racially pure marriage partners; for instance, Cinderella with the heroine as racially pure, the stepmother as an alien, and the prince with an unspoiled instinct being able to distinguish. Writers who have written about the Holocaust have combined the tales with their memoirs, as Jane Yolen in her Briar Rose.

Three individual works of Wilhelm Grimm include Altdänische Heldenlieder, Balladen und Märchen ('Old Danish Heroic Songs, Ballads, and Folktales') in 1811, Über deutsche Runen ('On German Runes') in 1821, and Die deutsche Heldensage ('The German Heroic Saga') in 1829.

The Grimm anthology has been a source of inspiration for artists and composers. Arthur Rackham, Walter Crane, and Rie Cramer are among the artists who have created illustrations based on the stories.

English-language collections
"Grimms' Fairy Tales in English" by D.L. Ashliman provides a hyperlinked list of 50 to 100 English-language collections that have been digitized and made available online. They were published in print from the 1820s to 1920s. Listings may identify all translators and illustrators who were credited on the title pages, and certainly identify some others.

Translations of the 1812 edition
These are some translations of the original collection, also known as the first edition of Volume I.

 Zipes, Jack, ed., tr. (2014) The Original Folk and Fairy Tales of the Brothers Grimm: the complete first edition.
 Loo, Oliver ed., tr. (2014) The Original 1812 Grimm Fairy Tales. A New Translation of the 1812 First Edition Kinder- und Hausmärchen Collected through the Brothers Grimm

Translations of the 1857 edition

These are some translations of the two-volume seventh edition (1857):

 Hunt, Margaret, ed., tr. (2014) Grimm’s Household Tales,  with Author’s Notes, 2 vols (1884).
 Manheim, Ralph, tr. (1977) Grimms’ Tales for Young and Old: The Complete Stories. New York: Doubleday.
 Luke, David; McKay, Gilbert; Schofield, Philip tr. (1982) Brothers Grimm: Selected Tales.

List of stories by the Brothers Grimm

The code "KHM" stands for Kinder- und Hausmärchen. The titles are those as of 1857. Some titles in 1812 were different. All editions from 1812 until 1857 split the stories into two volumes.

This section contains 201 listings, as "KHM 1" to "KHM 210" in numerical sequence plus "KHM 151a".
The next section "No longer included in the last edition" contains 30 listings including 18 that are numbered in series "1812 KHM ###" and 12 without any label.

Volume 1

The Frog King, or Iron Heinrich (Der Froschkönig oder der eiserne Heinrich): KHM 1
Cat and Mouse in Partnership (Katze und Maus in Gesellschaft): KHM 2
Mary's Child (Marienkind): KHM 3
The Story of the Youth Who Went Forth to Learn What Fear Was (Märchen von einem, der auszog das Fürchten zu lernen): KHM 4
The Wolf and the Seven Young Kids (Der Wolf und die sieben jungen Geißlein): KHM 5
Faithful John or Trusty John (Der treue Johannes): KHM 6
The Good Bargain (Der gute Handel): KHM 7
The Wonderful Musician or The Strange Musician (Der wunderliche Spielmann): KHM 8
The Twelve Brothers (Die zwölf Brüder): KHM 9
The Pack of Ragamuffins (Das Lumpengesindel): KHM 10
Little Brother and Little Sister (Brüderchen und Schwesterchen): KHM 11
Rapunzel: KHM 12
The Three Little Men in the Wood (Die drei Männlein im Walde): KHM 13
The Three Spinning Women (Die drei Spinnerinnen): KHM 14
Hansel and Gretel (Hänsel und Gretel): KHM 15
The Three Snake-Leaves (Die drei Schlangenblätter): KHM 16
The White Snake (Die weiße Schlange): KHM 17
The Straw, the Coal, and the Bean (Strohhalm, Kohle und Bohne): KHM 18
The Fisherman and His Wife (Von dem Fischer und seiner Frau): KHM 19
The Brave Little Tailor or The Valiant Little Tailor or The Gallant Tailor (Das tapfere Schneiderlein): KHM 20
Cinderella (Aschenputtel): KHM 21
The Riddle (Das Rätsel): KHM 22
The Mouse, the Bird, and the Sausage (Von dem Mäuschen, Vögelchen und der Bratwurst): KHM 23
Mother Holle or Mother Hulda or Old Mother Frost (Frau Holle): KHM 24
The Seven Ravens (Die sieben Raben): KHM 25
Little Red Cap or Little Red Riding Hood (Rotkäppchen): KHM 26
The Bremen Town Musicians  (Die Bremer Stadtmusikanten): KHM 27
The Singing Bone (Der singende Knochen): KHM 28
The Devil With the Three Golden Hairs (Der Teufel mit den drei goldenen Haaren): KHM 29
The Louse and the Flea (Läuschen und Flöhchen): KHM 30
The Girl Without Hands or The Handless Maiden (Das Mädchen ohne Hände): KHM 31
Clever Hans (Der gescheite Hans): KHM 32
The Three Languages (Die drei Sprachen): KHM 33
Clever Elsie (Die kluge Else): KHM 34
The Tailor in Heaven (Der Schneider im Himmel): KHM 35
The Magic Table, the Gold-Donkey, and the Club in the Sack ("Tischchen deck dich, Goldesel und Knüppel aus dem Sack" also known as "Tischlein, deck dich!"): KHM 36
Thumbling (Daumesdick)  (see also Tom Thumb): KHM 37
The Wedding of Mrs. Fox (Die Hochzeit der Frau Füchsin): KHM 38
The Elves (Die Wichtelmänner): KHM 39
 The Elves and the Shoemaker (Erstes Märchen)
 Second Story (Zweites Märchen)
 Third Story (Drittes Märchen)
The Robber Bridegroom (Der Räuberbräutigam): KHM 40
Herr Korbes: KHM 41
The Godfather (Der Herr Gevatter): KHM 42
Mother Trudy (Frau Trude): KHM 43
Godfather Death (Der Gevatter Tod): KHM 44
Thumbling's Travels (see also Tom Thumb) (Daumerlings Wanderschaft): KHM 45
Fitcher's Bird (Fitchers Vogel): KHM 46
The Juniper Tree (Von dem Machandelboom): KHM 47
Old Sultan (Der alte Sultan): KHM 48
The Six Swans (Die sechs Schwäne): KHM 49
Briar Rose (Dornröschen): KHM 50
Foundling-Bird (Fundevogel): KHM 51
King Thrushbeard (König Drosselbart): KHM 52
Snow White (Schneewittchen): KHM 53
The Knapsack, the Hat, and the Horn (Der Ranzen, das Hütlein und das Hörnlein): KHM 54
Rumpelstiltskin (Rumpelstilzchen): KHM 55
Sweetheart Roland (Der Liebste Roland): KHM 56
The Golden Bird (Der goldene Vogel): KHM 57
The Dog and the Sparrow (Der Hund und der Sperling): KHM 58
Frederick and Catherine (Der Frieder und das Katherlieschen): KHM 59
The Two Brothers (Die zwei Brüder): KHM 60
The Little Peasant (Das Bürle): KHM 61
The Queen Bee (Die Bienenkönigin): KHM 62
The Three Feathers (Die drei Federn): KHM 63
The Golden Goose (Die goldene Gans): KHM 64
All-Kinds-of-Fur (Allerleirauh): KHM 65
The Hare's Bride (Häsichenbraut): KHM 66
The Twelve Huntsmen (Die zwölf Jäger): KHM 67
 The Thief and His Master (De Gaudeif un sien Meester): KHM 68
Jorinde and Joringel (Jorinde und Joringel): KHM 69
The Three Sons of Fortune (Die drei Glückskinder): KHM 70
How Six Men got on in the World (Sechse kommen durch die ganze Welt): KHM 71
The Wolf and the Man (Der Wolf und der Mensch): KHM 72
The Wolf and the Fox (Der Wolf und der Fuchs): KHM 73
Gossip Wolf and the Fox (Der Fuchs und die Frau Gevatterin): KHM 74
The Fox and the Cat (Der Fuchs und die Katze): KHM 75
The Pink (Die Nelke): KHM 76
Clever Gretel (Das kluge Gretel): KHM 77
The Old Man and his Grandson (Der alte Großvater und der Enkel): KHM 78
The Water Nixie (Die Wassernixe): KHM 79
The Death of the Little Hen (Von dem Tode des Hühnchens): KHM 80
Brother Lustig (Bruder Lustig) KHM 81
Gambling Hansel (De Spielhansl): KHM 82
Hans in Luck (Hans im Glück): KHM 83
Hans Married (Hans heiratet): KHM 84
The Gold-Children (Die Goldkinder): KHM 85
The Fox and the Geese (Der Fuchs und die Gänse): KHM 86

Volume 2

The Poor Man and the Rich Man (Der Arme und der Reiche): KHM 87
The Singing, Springing Lark (Das singende springende Löweneckerchen): KHM 88
The Goose Girl (Die Gänsemagd): KHM 89
The Young Giant (Der junge Riese): KHM 90
The Gnome (Dat Erdmänneken): KHM 91
The King of the Gold Mountain (Der König vom goldenen Berg): KHM 92
The Raven (Die Raben): KHM 93
The Peasant's Wise Daughter (Die kluge Bauerntochter): KHM 94
Old Hildebrand (Der alte Hildebrand): KHM 95
The Three Little Birds (De drei Vügelkens): KHM 96
The Water of Life (Das Wasser des Lebens): KHM 97
Doctor Know-all (Doktor Allwissend): KHM 98
The Spirit in the Bottle (Der Geist im Glas): KHM 99
The Devil's Sooty Brother (Des Teufels rußiger Bruder): KHM 100
Bearskin (Bärenhäuter): KHM 101
The Willow Wren and the Bear (Der Zaunkönig und der Bär): KHM 102
Sweet Porridge (Der süße Brei): KHM 103
Wise Folks (Die klugen Leute): KHM 104
Tales of the Paddock (Märchen von der Unke): KHM 105
The Poor Miller's Boy and the Cat (Der arme Müllerbursch und das Kätzchen): KHM 106
The Two Travelers (Die beiden Wanderer): KHM 107
Hans My Hedgehog (Hans mein Igel): KHM 108
The Shroud (Das Totenhemdchen): KHM 109
The Jew Among Thorns (Der Jude im Dorn): KHM 110
The Skillful Huntsman (Der gelernte Jäger): KHM 111
The Flail from Heaven (Der Dreschflegel vom Himmel): KHM 112
The Two Kings' Children (Die beiden Königskinder): KHM 113
The Cunning Little Tailor or The Story of a Clever Tailor (vom klugen Schneiderlein): KHM 114
The Bright Sun Brings it to Light (Die klare Sonne bringt's an den Tag): KHM 115
The Blue Light (Das blaue Licht): KHM 116
The Willful Child (Das eigensinnige Kind): KHM 117
The Three Army Surgeons (Die drei Feldscherer): KHM 118
The Seven Swabians (Die sieben Schwaben): KHM 119
The Three Apprentices (Die drei Handwerksburschen): KHM 120
The King's Son Who Feared Nothing (Der Königssohn, der sich vor nichts fürchtete): KHM 121
Donkey Cabbages (Der Krautesel): KHM 122
The Old Woman in the Wood (Die Alte im Wald): KHM 123
The Three Brothers (Die drei Brüder): KHM 124
The Devil and His Grandmother (Der Teufel und seine Großmutter): KHM 125
Ferdinand the Faithful and Ferdinand the Unfaithful (Ferenand getrü und Ferenand ungetrü): KHM 126
The Iron Stove (Der Eisenofen): KHM 127
The Lazy Spinner (Die faule Spinnerin): KHM 128
The Four Skillful Brothers (Die vier kunstreichen Brüder): KHM 129
One-Eye, Two-Eyes, and Three-Eyes (Einäuglein, Zweiäuglein und Dreiäuglein): KHM 130
Fair Katrinelje and Pif-Paf-Poltrie (Die schöne Katrinelje und Pif Paf Poltrie): KHM 131
The Fox and the Horse (Der Fuchs und das Pferd): KHM 132
The Shoes that were Danced to Pieces (Die zertanzten Schuhe): KHM 133
The Six Servants (Die sechs Diener): KHM 134
The White and the Black Bride (Die weiße und die schwarze Braut): KHM 135
Iron John (Eisenhans): KHM 136
The Three Black Princesses (De drei schwatten Prinzessinnen): KHM 137
Knoist and his Three Sons (Knoist un sine dre Sühne): KHM 138
The Maid of Brakel (Dat Mäken von Brakel): KHM 139
My Household (Das Hausgesinde): KHM 140
The Lambkin and the Little Fish (Das Lämmchen und das Fischchen): KHM 141
Simeli Mountain (Simeliberg): KHM 142
Going a Traveling (Up Reisen gohn): KHM 143, appeared in the 1819 edition
 KHM 143 in the 1812/1815 edition was Die Kinder in Hungersnot (The Starving Children)
The Donkey or The Little Donkey (Das Eselein): KHM 144
The Ungrateful Son (Der undankbare Sohn): KHM 145
The Turnip (Die Rübe): KHM 146
The Old Man Made Young Again (Das junggeglühte Männlein): KHM 147
The Lord's Animals and the Devil's (Des Herrn und des Teufels Getier): KHM 148
The Beam (Der Hahnenbalken): KHM 149
The Old Beggar Woman (Die alte Bettelfrau): KHM 150
The Three Sluggards (Die drei Faulen): KHM 151
The Twelve Idle Servants (Die zwölf faulen Knechte): KHM 151a
The Shepherd Boy (Das Hirtenbüblein): KHM 152
The Star Money (Die Sterntaler): KHM 153
The Stolen Farthings (Der gestohlene Heller): KHM 154
Looking for a Bride (Die Brautschau): KHM 155
The Hurds (Die Schlickerlinge): KHM 156
The Sparrow and His Four Children (Der Sperling und seine vier Kinder): KHM 157
The Story of Schlauraffen Land (Das Märchen vom Schlaraffenland): KHM 158
The Ditmarsch Tale of Lies (Das dietmarsische Lügenmärchen): KHM 159
A Riddling Tale (Rätselmärchen): KHM 160
Snow-White and Rose-Red (Schneeweißchen und Rosenrot): KHM 161
The Wise Servant (Der kluge Knecht): KHM 162
The Glass Coffin (Der gläserne Sarg): KHM 163
Lazy Henry (Der faule Heinz): KHM 164
The Griffin (Der Vogel Greif): KHM 165
Strong Hans (Der starke Hans): KHM 166
The Peasant in Heaven (Das Bürle im Himmel): KHM 167
Lean Lisa (Die hagere Liese): KHM 168
The Hut in the Forest (Das Waldhaus): KHM 169
Sharing Joy and Sorrow (Lieb und Leid teilen): KHM 170
The Willow Wren (Der Zaunkönig): KHM 171
The Sole (Die Scholle): KHM 172
The Bittern and the Hoopoe (Rohrdommel und Wiedehopf): KHM 173
The Owl (Die Eule): KHM 174
The Moon (Brothers Grimm) (Der Mond): KHM 175
The Duration of Life (Die Lebenszeit): KHM 176
Death's Messengers (Die Boten des Todes): KHM 177
Master Pfreim (Meister Pfriem): KHM 178
The Goose-Girl at the Well (Die Gänsehirtin am Brunnen): KHM 179
Eve's Various Children (Die ungleichen Kinder Evas): KHM 180
The Nixie of the Mill-Pond (Die Nixe im Teich): KHM 181
The Gifts of the Little People/The Little Folks' Presents(Die Geschenke des kleinen Volkes): KHM 182
The Giant and the Tailor (Der Riese und der Schneider): KHM 183
The Nail (Brothers Grimm) (Der Nagel): KHM 184
The Poor Boy in the Grave (Der arme Junge im Grab): KHM 185
The True Bride (Die wahre Braut): KHM 186
The Hare and the Hedgehog (Der Hase und der Igel): KHM 187
Spindle, Shuttle, and Needle (Spindel, Weberschiffchen und Nadel): KHM 188
The Peasant and the Devil (Der Bauer und der Teufel): KHM 189
The Crumbs on the Table (Die Brosamen auf dem Tisch): KHM 190
The Sea-Hare (Das Meerhäschen): KHM 191
The Master Thief (Der Meisterdieb): KHM 192
The Drummer (Der Trommler): KHM 193
The Ear of Corn (Die Kornähre): KHM 194
The Grave Mound (Der Grabhügel): KHM 195
Old Rinkrank (Oll Rinkrank): KHM 196
The Crystal Ball (Die Kristallkugel): KHM 197
Maid Maleen (Jungfrau Maleen): KHM 198
The Boots of Buffalo Leather (Der Stiefel von üffelleder): KHM 199
The Golden Key (Der goldene Schlüssel): KHM 200
The children's legends
First appeared in the G. Reimer 1819 edition at the end of volume 2.
Saint Joseph in the Forest (Der heilige Joseph im Walde): KHM 201
The Twelve Apostles (Brothers Grimm) (Die zwölf Apostel): KHM 202
The Rose (Die Rose): KHM 203
Poverty and Humility Lead to Heaven (Armut und Demut führen zum Himmel): KHM 204
God's Food (Gottes Speise): KHM 205
The Three Green Twigs (Die drei grünen Zweige): KHM 206
The Blessed Virgin's Little Glass (Muttergottesgläschen) or Our Lady's Little Glass: KHM 207
The Little Old Lady (Das alte Mütterchen) or The Aged Mother: KHM 208
The Heavenly Marriage (Die himmlische Hochzeit) or The Heavenly Wedding: KHM 209
The Hazel Branch (Die Haselrute): KHM 210

Removed from final edition

1812 KHM 6 Von der Nachtigall und der Blindschleiche (The Nightingale and the Slow Worm) also (The Nightingale and the Blindworm)
1812 KHM 8 Die Hand mit dem Messer (The Hand with the Knife)
1812 KHM 22 Wie Kinder Schlachtens miteinander gespielt haben (The Children Who Played Slaughtering)
1812 KHM 27 Der Tod und der Gänsehirt (Death and the Goose Keeper)
1812 KHM 33 Der gestiefelte Kater (Puss in Boots)
1812 KHM 37 Von der Serviette, dem Tornister, dem Kanonenhütlein und dem Horn (The Napkin, the Knapsack, the Cannon Shell, and the Horn)
1812 KHM 43 Die wunderliche Gasterei (The Strange Inn/The Wonderly Guesting Manor)
1812 KHM 54 Hans Dumm (Hans Stupid)
1812 KHM 62 Blaubart (Bluebeard)
1812 KHM 66 Hurleburlebutz
1812 KHM 70 Der Okerlo (The Okerlo)
1812 KHM 71 Prinzessin Mäusehaut (Princess Mouse Skin)
1812 KHM 72 Das Birnli will nit fallen (The Pear Doesn't Want to Fall)
1812 KHM 73 Das Mörderschloss (The Murder Castle)
1812 KHM 77 Vom Schreiner und Drechsler (The Carpenter and the Turner)
1812 KHM 82 Die drei Schwestern (The Three Sisters)
1812 KHM 85A Schneeblume (Snow Flower)
1812 KHM 85D Vom Prinz Johannes (Fragment) (Prince Johannes)
 Die Prinzessin auf der Erbse (The Princess and the Pea)
 Der Faule und der Fleißige (The Sluggard and the Diligent)
 Der gute Lappen (Fragment) (The Good Rag)
 Die heilige Frau Kummernis (The Holy Woman Kummernis)
 Die Krähen (The Crows)
 Der Löwe und der Frosch (The Lion and the Frog)
 Der Räuber und seine Söhne (The Robber and His Sons)
 Der Soldat und der Schreiner (The Soldier and the Carpenter)
 Die treuen Tiere (The Faithful Animals)
 Das Unglück (The Accident)
 Der wilde Mann (The Wild Man)
 Der Schmied und der Teufel (The Smith and the Devil)

Explanatory notes

References

Bibliography

(Translations)
 ; volume 2;  vol. 1, vol. 2 via Internet Archive

 
 

 

(Other)

External links

 
 
The Original 1812 Grimm A web site for the Original 1812 Kinder und Hausmärchen featuring references and other useful information related to the 1812 book in English.
 

 
 Grimm's Fairy Tales
Collections of fairy tales
Memory of the World Register
1812 books
1810s children's books